Calcineurin subunit B type 1 also known as protein phosphatase 2B regulatory subunit 1 is a protein that in humans is encoded by the PPP3R1 gene.

Clinical significance 

The presence of a single nucleotide polymorphism rs1868402 in the PPP3R1 gene is strongly correlated with rapid progress of Alzheimer's disease.

References

Further reading

EF-hand-containing proteins